The 2017 FAM Youth Championship is the 6th season of the FAM Youth Championship.

Participated Teams
4 teams participated in this year's Youth Championship.

 Club Eagles U21s
 Thinadhoo Football Team U21s
 Maziya Sports & Recreation Club U21s
 United Victory U21s

Personnel

Format
Since only 5 teams are participating, the championship will be played on round robin basis. Each team will face every other team once respectively and the team with the most points will win the title.

Standings 
All matches are played in Malé, Maldives.
Times listed are Indian Ocean, Maldives, UTC+05:00.

Final

Statistics

Goal scorers

Hat-tricks

Clean sheets

Awards

References

External links
 FAM Youth Championship at Facebook
 FAM Youth Championship at Mihaaru Sports (Dhivehi)

FAM Youth Championship
2017 in Maldivian football